Hedgpeth is a surname, and may refer to:

 Harry Hedgpeth (1888–1966), Major League Baseball pitcher
 Joel Hedgpeth (1911–2006), American marine biologist
 Kim Roberts Hedgpeth, American lawyer and director of the American Federation of Television and Radio Artists

See also
 Hedgpeth Festival, 2006 music festival
 Hedgpeth Heights, mountains in Antarctica